Dejan Božić (born 22 January 1993) is a German-Serbian professional footballer who plays as a forward for Kickers Offenbach.

Career
Božić made his debut in the 3. Liga for Chemnitzer FC on 21 July 2019, starting against Waldhof Mannheim before being substituted out in the 90th minute for Pelle Hoppe, with the match finishing as a 1–1 home draw.

References

External links
 
 

1993 births
Living people
Sportspeople from Heilbronn
Footballers from Baden-Württemberg
German footballers
Serbian footballers
German people of Serbian descent
Association football forwards
FC Astoria Walldorf players
SC Freiburg II players
TuS Koblenz players
Chemnitzer FC players
SV Meppen players
Kickers Offenbach players
3. Liga players
Regionalliga players